Yevgeny Aleksandrovich Shevchenko (born 6 June 1996) is a Belarusian footballer who plays for Torpedo-BelAZ Zhodino.

International career
He made his Belarus national football team debut on 13 October 2019 in a Euro 2020 qualifier against Netherlands. He substituted Dzyanis Laptsew in the 83rd minute.

Honours
Dinamo Brest
Belarusian Super Cup winner: 2020

References

External links

Profile at FC Minsk website

1996 births
Living people
Belarusian footballers
Belarus international footballers
Association football forwards
FC Minsk players
FC Dynamo Brest players
FC Rukh Brest players
FC Torpedo-BelAZ Zhodino players